The 1924 United States presidential election in Texas took place on November 4, 1924, as part of the 1924 United States presidential election. State voters chose 20 representatives, or electors, to the Electoral College, who voted for president and vice president.

Texas was won easily by John W. Davis of West Virginia. Texas had been a Democratic stronghold since it first became a state in 1845, although Republican Herbert Hoover would win the state by a narrow margin in 1928.

Results

Results by county

See also
 United States presidential elections in Texas

Notes

References

Texas
1924
1924 Texas elections